Gwynedd Is Conwy (Welsh, meaning Gwynedd Below the Conwy) was the portion of the former Kingdom of Gwynedd lying between the River Conwy and River Dee. This area was also known as Y Berfeddwlad ('The Middle Land') as it lay between and was contested by the rival realms of Gwynedd and Powys. Today the area is mostly contained within the unitary authorities of Conwy, Denbighshire and Flintshire.

Medieval Wales

cy:Y Berfeddwlad